Crocodile Dundee is a series of action comedy films centered on a crocodile hunter named Michael J. "Crocodile" Dundee. The movies star Paul Hogan in the titular role, over the course of three feature films. Hogan refused several proposals for more Crocodile Dundee films.

Films

Crocodile Dundee (1986)

A New York reporter named Sue Charlton heads to Australia to interview the living legend, known as "Crocodile" Dundee. When she finally finds him in the vast Australian terrain, she is so enthralled with him that she brings him back with her to New York City. In New York, Dundee is amazed by the many wonders of the city life and the interesting people there. It's a whole new way of life for the crocodile hunting adventurer.

Crocodile Dundee II (1988)

Mick "Crocodile" Dundee is just settling into his new way of life, in a home in Manhattan, when a South American drug dealer abducts his girlfriend, Sue. The drug dealer believes that images of his criminal activities, taken by her photographer ex-husband, are now being held by her. The crime boss holds her hostage in New York under threatening pretences, hoping that she'll give up the evidence. The legendary intrepid Dundee is soon on the criminal's trail and, as an expert hunter and adventurer, he aims to rescue his hostage girlfriend.

Crocodile Dundee in Los Angeles (2001)

Dundee, an expert adventurer in the truest sense: a crocodile hunter from the wilds of the Australian Outback, and survivor of the dangers of New York City, now finds he must move to the luxury of Tinseltown - Los Angeles, California - when his wife, Sue, receives a new job as a newspaper bureau chief. "Mick" becomes an amateur undercover investigator when a conspiracy arises surrounding a Hollywood studio and their next big film release.

Future
Following the overwhelmingly positive response to the fake trailers from the Super Bowl commercial campaign, Chris Hemsworth confirmed the possibility of creating a film. In discussing the production on the short, he stated: "While shooting, Danny McBride and I spoke about if it could be a movie. We started to get worried that if this commercial is as good as we hoped it's going to be, people are going to be disappointed, we're going to have to make a movie. But I had so much fun making this commercial, I'd definitely be open to discussions about it".

Cast and characters

Additional crew and production details

Reception

Box office performance

Critical and public response

Home media
Paramount Pictures has released the Crocodile Dundee trilogy on Blu-ray in the U.S. on September 21, 2021. The third film is a debut for Blu-ray release.

Other media

Super Bowl LII commercial
Hogan refused several proposals for more Crocodile Dundee films. In January 2018, two trailers were released online for what was marketed as another film in the series, titled Dundee, with the tagline The son of a legend returns home. The film was said to star Danny McBride as Brian Dundee, the son of the original Michael J. "Crocodile" Dundee. The trailers also feature cameo appearances by Australian actors Chris Hemsworth, Hugh Jackman, Russell Crowe, Margot Robbie, Isla Fisher, Ruby Rose, Liam Hemsworth, Jessica Mauboy, and Luke Bracey. Various aspects of the campaign made some publications believe that the film was an elaborate hoax. It was later reported that these ads were actually part of a lead up to a Super Bowl commercial for Tourism Australia. McBride and Hemsworth starred in the final commercial, which included Hogan in a cameo.

See also 
 The Very Excellent Mr. Dundee

References 

 
Action film series
Comedy film series
Paramount Pictures franchises